is a passenger railway station located in the town of Kamikawa, Kanzaki District, Hyōgo Prefecture, Japan, operated by West Japan Railway Company (JR West).

Lines

Station layout
The station consists of two opposed side platforms connected to the station building by a footbridge. The station is unattended.

Platforms

Adjacent stations

|-
!colspan=5|West Japan Railway Company

History
Niino Station opened on October 5, 1951.  With the privatization of the Japan National Railways (JNR) on April 1, 1987, the station came under the aegis of the West Japan Railway Company.

Passenger statistics
In fiscal 2016, the station was used by an average of 595 passengers daily.

Surrounding area
 Joko-ji temple

See also
List of railway stations in Japan

References

External links

  

Railway stations in Hyōgo Prefecture
Bantan Line
Railway stations in Japan opened in 1951
Kamikawa, Hyōgo